The following is a list of events affecting Tamil language television in 2023 from (India (Tamilnadu), Sri Lanka, Singapore, Malaysia and Tamil diaspora). Events listed include television show debuts, and finales; channel launches, and closures; stations changing or adding their network affiliations; and information about changes of ownership of channels or stations.

Events and New channels

January

New Series and Shows

Soap Operas

Shows

Debut Web Series

Ending Series and Shows

Series

Shows

Milestone Episodes

Movie Premieres of 2023

January

February

March

Deaths

See also
 2022 in Tamil television
 2021 in Tamil television
 2020 in Tamil television
 2019 in Tamil television
 Television in Tamil language

References

2023 in Tamil-language television